Séamus Kirk (born 26 April 1945) is an Irish former Fianna Fáil politician who served as Ceann Comhairle of Dáil Éireann from 2009 to 2011 and a Minister of State from 1987 to 1992. He served as a Teachta Dála (TD) for the Louth constituency from 1982 to 2016.

Background
Kirk was born in Drumkeith, County Louth. He is married to Mary McGeough. They have three sons and one daughter and live in Knockbridge, County Louth. He was educated at CBS Dundalk. He was a farmer and agricultural adviser before entering politics. He is a former footballer who played for the Louth county team.

Political career
He was a member of Louth County Council from 1974 to 1985, and he was first elected to the Dáil Éireann at the November 1982 general election as a member of the 24th Dáil. He was returned in each subsequent election until his retirement.

Kirk was Minister of State at the Department of Agriculture and Food from 1987 to 1992. He served as chairman of the Fianna Fáil parliamentary party from 2002 until October 2009. At the 2004 European Parliament election, he was an unsuccessful candidate in the East constituency. His running mate Liam Aylward took a seat for Fianna Fáil.

On 13 October 2009, Kirk succeeded John O'Donoghue as Ceann Comhairle after O'Donoghue resigned over an expenses scandal. He was nominated for that post by Taoiseach Brian Cowen and seconded by Tanáiste Mary Coughlan, and he defeated Fine Gael's Dinny McGinley by 87 votes to 51 votes. McGinley had been nominated by his party's leader, Enda Kenny.

In September 2014, he announced he would not be contesting the 2016 general election.

References

External links
Séamus Kirk's page on the Fianna Fáil website

1945 births
Living people
Alumni of the University of Galway
Fianna Fáil TDs
Irish farmers
Irish sportsperson-politicians
Local councillors in County Louth
Louth inter-county Gaelic footballers
Members of the 24th Dáil
Members of the 25th Dáil
Members of the 26th Dáil
Members of the 27th Dáil
Members of the 28th Dáil
Members of the 29th Dáil
Members of the 30th Dáil
Members of the 31st Dáil
Ministers of State of the 25th Dáil
Ministers of State of the 26th Dáil
Politicians from County Louth
Presiding officers of Dáil Éireann